Pipedream is the first solo album from Lindisfarne singer Alan Hull. The album reached No. 29 in the UK, while also charting in Australia.

Cover artwork
The cover artwork is based on a painting by René Magritte.

Music 
"Blue Murder" has been compared to Neil Young's 1969 song "Down by the River".

Track listing
All songs written by Alan Hull.

 "Breakfast" - 3:29
 "Justanothersadsong" - 2:52
 "Money Game" - 2:41
 "STD 0632" - 3:06
 "United States of Mind" - 3:04
 "Country Gentleman's Wife" - 3:36
 "Numbers (Travelling Band)" - 3:48
 "For The Bairns" - 2:25
 "Drug Song" - 3:07
 "Song for a Windmill" 2:44
 "Blue Murder" - 5:07
 "I Hate To See You Cry" 3:22

Charts

Personnel
Alan Hull - vocals, guitar, piano, harmonium, "Guinness, wine, tequila, Pernod, Coca-Cola"
John Turnbull - guitar, "orange juice, health foods"
Colin Gibson - bass, "mental indecision, snuff and herbal tobacco"
Ken Craddock - piano, organ, harmonium, electric piano, guitar, "Guinness, wine, tequila, Pernod, Coca-cola and anything else around at the time"
Ray Laidlaw - drums, "common sense"
Ray Jackson - harp, mandolin, vocals, "Rude noises"
Dave Brooks - saxophone on "For The Bairns"
Technical
Mickey Sweeney - producer, "high level energy"
Roy T. Baker - engineer, mixing, "woofy woofy"
Ken Scott, Mike Stone - engineer
Ian Vincenti - sleeve design
René Magritte - "La Lampe Philosophique" front cover

References 

1973 debut albums
Alan Hull albums
Charisma Records albums
Elektra Records albums